Oman competed at the 2008 Summer Olympics in Beijing, China.

The country sent a female athlete to the Olympic Games for the first time. Buthaina Yaqoubi  represented Oman in the women's 100m sprint.

Athletics

Men

Women

Key
Note–Ranks given for track events are within the athlete's heat only
Q = Qualified for the next round
q = Qualified for the next round as a fastest loser or, in field events, by position without achieving the qualifying target
NR = National record
N/A = Round not applicable for the event
Bye = Athlete not required to compete in round

Shooting

Men

Swimming

Oman was represented by one swimmer.

References

Nations at the 2008 Summer Olympics
2008
Olympics